"Mixed Personalities" is a song by American rapper YNW Melly featuring fellow American rapper Kanye West. It was produced by C-Clip Beatz and BoogzDaBeast. A music video for the song was released in January 2019 along with Melly's mixtape We All Shine.

Background
In mid-2018, Kanye West began collaborating with newer generation rappers, such as Lil Pump for "I Love It", XXXTentacion posthumously for "One Minute" and "The Storm", and 6ix9ine for "Mama" and "Kanga". West was introduced to YNW Melly's music through CyHi the Prynce and decided to fly him over to Los Angeles. YNW Melly previewed many songs from We All Shine to West, including "Mixed Personalities", after which West asked to feature on the track.

On December 5, 2018, YNW Melly shared videos onto Instagram of him meeting with West in a recording studio.

Composition
Melly mostly sings about a girl switching up on him in the song. West sings in auto-tune, which is reminiscent of the rapper's sound from his fourth studio album 808s & Heartbreak (2008). Dialogue of late former Marine drill instruct-turned-actor R. Lee Ermey saying "Because I am hard, you will not like me" is sampled from the 1987 war film Full Metal Jacket.

Music video

The music video for "Mixed Personalities" was directed by Cole Bennett and released on January 18, 2019, the same date as the release of YNW Melly's studio album We All Shine. The video includes West and Melly hanging out with CGI robots with grass, trees and vines behind them.

Personnel
Credits adapted from Tidal.
 C-Clip Beats – production
 BoogzDaBeast – additional production

Charts

Weekly charts

Year-end charts

Certifications

References

2019 songs
YNW Melly songs
Kanye West songs